Rubus calvatus  is a species of  bramble endemic to the British Isles.

Description
Rubus calvatus is a shrub with a red, furrowed, arching stem which bears numerous prickles. Each leaf has five non-overlapping leaflets; these are deep green and hairless above. Flowers are pink, and the fruit develops from September on.

Distribution
Rubus calvatus  is found in scattered sites in England, E Wales, and the north east of Ireland. The greatest concentration of locations are in the Pennines and Peak District in England.

References

calvatus
Flora of Europe
Flora of England
Flora of Ireland
Flora of Wales